Vrancea may refer to:

Vrancea County, Romania
Vrancea Mountains, Romania
Vrancea, a village in Burila Mare Commune, Mehedinţi County